Enrico Peruffo (born 1 August 1985) is an Italian former road cyclist.

Major results

2003
 1st  Junior National Road Race Championships
 1st Overall Tre Giorni Orobica
 1st Stage 2 Giro della Lunigiana
 5th Trofeo comune di Vertova
2007
 4th Trofeo Franco Balestra
 5th Trofeo Alcide Degasperi
 6th Gran Premio della Liberazione
2008
 9th Memorial Davide Fardelli
2009
 1st  Road race, Mediterranean Games
 1st Stage 6 Girobio
 2nd Trofeo Franco Balestra
 6th Trofeo Edil C
 10th Coppa della Pace
2010
 3rd Neuseen Classics
 5th Circuito de Getxo
 9th Ronde van Drenthe

References

1985 births
Living people
Italian male cyclists
People from Moncalieri
Mediterranean Games gold medalists for Italy
Mediterranean Games medalists in cycling
Competitors at the 2009 Mediterranean Games
Cyclists from Piedmont
Sportspeople from the Metropolitan City of Turin